Superstar is a 2019 Pakistani  romantic, musical-drama film, starring Bilal Ashraf and Mahira Khan. It is directed by Mohammed Ehteshamuddin, produced by Momina & Duraid Films, and the music and screenplay are by Azaan Sami Khan. 
The story of the film follows Noori (played by Mahira Khan), who works in a theatre run by her uncle Agha Jan (played by Nadeem Baig), her entry in films and her romance and betrayal. The principal photography of the film began in March 2019. It was released on the occasion of Eid al-Adha on 12 August 2019 by Hum Films under Momina & Duraid Films.

Plot 
The story is about Noori, a struggling theatre artist  who wants to work in films. She has been doing advertisements along with theatre. One day her advertisement is scheduled along with Sameer. The crew waits for him while Noori practices along with props and costumes backstage, Sameer sees her and gets attracted towards her. During the shoot, the director does not like Noori's acting and asks her to leave. Sameer is adamant that he will work only if Noori is taken back. Eventually they start going out together. Noori's life takes turn she has to choose between love and her career.

Cast 
 Bilal Ashraf as Sameer Khan
 Mahira Khan as Noori
Alizeh Shah as Chutki
 Nadeem Baig as Agha Jaan
 Jawed Sheikh as Zulfiqar Khan
 Marina Khan as Laila Khan
 Asma Abbas as Choti Ammi
 Saife Hassan as Zahid Malik
 Ali Kazmi as Shaan
 Waqar Hussain as Bobby

Special appearances
 Kubra Khan 
Syra Shehroz
 Hania Aamir
 Osman Khalid Butt
 Mani
 Fahim Burney
 Adnan Shah Tipu  
 Humayun Saeed
 Umesh Kumar Gola

Production
The film was announced in August 2018 by producer Momina Duraid. She stated that her next film titled Superstar, starring Mahira Khan and Bilal Ashraf, to be directed by Ehtishamuddin on screenplay of Azaan Sami Khan was under pre-production stage. In an interview she said that Azaan who has written the screenplay was behind the project. She added, "It’s a genre that hasn’t been made in Pakistan yet, very theatrical and something I had been wanting to do for a while.”

Filming began in March 2019. The lead actress Mahira Khan shared pictures from the set on her Instagram account.

Marketing and release
The official trailer of the film was released by Hum TV on 15 July 2019. It garnered 4 million views since its release on YouTube. The official teaser of the song "Ghalat Fehmi" was launched by Hum TV on 25 July 2019. It garnered 6 million views since its release on YouTube.

Superstar has been certified with a runtime of 135 mins by British Board of Film Classification and was released theatrically on Eid al-Adha, on 12 August 2019 by Hum Films under Momina & Duraid Films.

Soundtrack

The music of the film is composed by Azaan Sami Khan and  Saad Sultan. While the lyrics are by Shakeel Sohail, the qawwali lyrics are by A. M. Turaz in the song "Ghalat Fehmi".

Reception

Box office
The film grossed 2 crores in its opening day in Pakistan taking its total 2 days collection to 4 crores. The film collected a total of 6.3 crore at the domestic box office and a total of 5.1 crore from overseas markets. Its worldwide box office collection as of 14 August was 11.4 crore.

After 7 days, the film had grossed 13.2 crore domestically.  its worldwide gross stood at  21.15 crore. As of September 4, Superstar has collected 20.5 crores from Pakistan and 6.41 crores from overseas for a total of 26.91 crores. Superstar has become the highest grossing Pakistani film of 2019. The film since its premiere in August this year managed to cross PKR 300 Million on local and international box office both.

Critical response
Hassan Kazmi of Masala.com rated the film 4 out of 5 stars and stated, "Mahira Khan and Bilal Ashraf have blown away everyone with how good they are in this film with excellent music and screenplay from Azaan Sami Khan". He further mentioned, "it has some of the best acting performances, brilliant music, and remarkably executed storyline. Director Mohammed Ehtehshaamuddin deserves every bit of the praises for this wonderful jewel". Shahjehan Saleem of Diva Magazine Pakistan rating the film 4 out of 5 stars, praised it for its cinematography and overall acting skills and stated, "While both Bilal and Mahira in the past have received critique over their acting skills, Superstar will prove to be the turning point in their careers. Bilal especially has overshadowed everyone in the film." He further added, "Superstar is definitely not a typical Pakistani movie made these days. It has a soul in it. Kudos to the director Ehteshamuddin."

Aamna Haider Isani of Something Haute rated  4/5 stars and remarked, "Superstar is like a well cut and perfectly polished diamond that sparkles from every angle". She further stated that, "This is Mahira at her phenomenally best, and this should put all naysayers and critics to rest".  She also praised Bilal Ashraf and wrote, "Bilal Ashraf is the dark horse of the movie". She concluded by saying, "One can go on and on about the strengths of the film but conclusively, not wanting to give anything away, I do have to say that Superstar is one of the best Pakistani films I have ever seen".

Yousuf Mehmood of  Pakistani Cinema.net rated the film 3/5  and wrote, "Subtle nods to the film industry of yesterday, clever dialogues, charming details, an overall freshness to the script despite a formula we’ve seen a hundred times, and some great performances by Mahira Khan and Nadeem Baig, give the film the emotional weight it needs to resonate with the masses.". Mohammed Kamran Jawaid of Dawn gave a positive review by stating, "With its emotion-raising climax, director Ehteshamuddin’s Superstar is an intelligently crafted film that has only a few snags"

Shafiq-ul-Hassan of The Express Tribune Blogs rated 3.5/5 stars and praised the performances, direction and writing thoroughly and remarked, "It won’t be wrong to say that Superstar is one of Mahira’s best performances since Humsafar"  and concluded by writing, "On the basis of content, performance, storytelling and music, Superstar is a brilliant entertainer". Asjad Khan of  Oye Yeah heavily praised  Mahira Khan's performance and wrote, "To surmise, Superstar is an uncomplicated but dreamy love story with excellent performances, and beautiful music". Omair Alavi of  Box Office Insights rated 4/5 stars and wrote, "On the whole, Superstar is a film that is time to perfection for the audience". He further added, " The combo of Ehteshamuddin and Mustafa Afridi also guarantees quality writing and direction which is their specialty, and with Superstar they have entered filmdom, hopefully for good".

Rafay Mehmood of  The Express Tribune rated 2.5/5 stars and criticised it by writing, "Despite some very creative blocking choices by Ehtesham and relatable incidents within the context of Pakistan’s film industry, Superstar, to repeat the same old story, is a film flawed on paper. Don’t confuse it for being a bad story, in fact, it has a semblance of a story which is a big deal by Pakistani standards. However, the film as a whole is unsure about what it wants to be and that is perhaps its curse." Sonia Ashraf of Images Dawn giving a mixed review stated, "Not only did it humanise the industry, it was a nice break from the desperate attempts at wacky plot twists aimed to shock the audience. Superstar is a simple love story and there's nothing wrong with that. Had the treatment been better, the script detailed, this would've been the film of the year".

Omair Alavi further writing for  Hum Spotlight remarked, "The verdict is out – Mahira Khan’s Superstar makes you fall in love again". Writing for Brandsynario he rated the film  4/5 stars and stated, "There are films that inspire and films that lead, and then there is SUPERSTAR that does both. Mahira Khan's latest is probably her best work so far, even better than Raees".

Accolades

See also
 Cinema of Pakistan
 List of Pakistani films of 2019

References

External links 
 
 

2010s Urdu-language films
2019 films
Pakistani musical films
2010s musical films